The Scarlet Dove is a 1961 Finnish thriller film directed by Matti Kassila. It was entered into the 11th Berlin International Film Festival. It was Tauno Palo's final screen role.

Cast
 Tauno Palo - Dr. Olavi Aitamaa
 Gunvor Sandkvist - Helena Aitamaa
 Helen Elde - Irja Huurre / Ritva
 Matti Oravisto - Judge Rantanen / Helena's Lover
 Risto Mäkelä - Mankela
 Uuno Montonen - Pastor Svanholm
 Anton Soini - Man Laying by the Road / Shoe String Vendor / Laughing Man at the Street / Proferros Aitamaa
 Arttu Suuntala - Detective Maurila
 Pertti Palo - Young Man at the Kiosk
 Liana Kaarina - Kiosk Vendor
 Martta Kinnunen - Martta, House Maid
 Tauno Söder - Optician
 Paavo Hukkinen - Sailor
 Unto Salminen - Doctor at the Murder Scene
 Eila Pehkonen - Woman at the Customs Office
 Tuukka Soitso - Man at the Customs Office
 Irja Rannikko - Drug Store Keeper
 Rauha Rentola - Customer at the Drug Store
 Hannes Veivo - Detective

References

External links

1961 films
1960s Finnish-language films
1960s thriller films
Finnish black-and-white films
Films directed by Matti Kassila
Finnish thriller films